Shultz Peak is a sharp peak 7 miles (11 km) south of Mount Armytage, where it overlooks the north flank of Mawson Glacier. It was mapped by United States Geological Survey (USGS) from ground surveys and Navy air photos. It was named by Advisory Committee on Antarctic Names (US-ACAN) in 1964 for Lieutenant Willard E. Shultz, U.S. Navy, supply officer at McMurdo Station, 1962.

Mountains of Victoria Land
Scott Coast